The 1909 All England Badminton Championships was a badminton tournament held at the London Rifle Brigade Drill Hall, Islington, London, England, from March 3 to March 6, 1909.

Meriel Lucas won a fifth Championship women's singles title and a ninth women's doubles title to take her total to 15 Championship titles. Frank Chesterton won the men's singles and doubles.

Final results

Men's singles
There was only one first round match between G. T. Crombie & S. Ziffo in which Crombie received a walkover.

Women's singles
The first round consisted of just one match in which Lavinia Radeglia defeated Alice Gowenlock 11-9 13-12

Men's doubles

Women's doubles

Mixed doubles
The first round consisted of just one match in which Edward Hawthorn & C. K. Petersen defeated W. D. Bayne & Miss Radley 15-7, 15-13.

References

All England Open Badminton Championships
All England Badminton Championships
All England Championships
All England Open Badminton Championships in London
All England Badminton Championships
All England Badminton Championships